RAF Home Command was the Royal Air Force command that was responsible for the maintenance and training of reserve organisations from formation on 1 February 1939 as RAF Reserve Command with interruptions until it ceased to exist on 1 April 1959.

History
The Command was formed as RAF Reserve Command on 1 February 1939. It was absorbed into RAF Flying Training Command on 27 May 1940 but reformed again on 1 May 1946. It was then renamed RAF Home Command on 1 August 1950 and absorbed into RAF Flying Training Command again on 1 April 1959.

The command's communications squadron, the Home Command Communication Squadron, was formed on 1 August 1950 at RAF White Waltham and disestablished on 1 April 1959, still at White Waltham, becoming the Flying Training Command Communication Squadron RAF.

Air Officer Commanding-in-Chief
Air Officer Commanding-in-Chief included:
RAF Reserve Command
1 February 1939 Air Marshal Sir Christopher Courtney
28 August 1939 Air Chief Marshal Sir John Steel
22 April 1940 Air Vice Marshal Sir William Welsh
Note: The Command was not in existence from May 1940 to May 1946
1 May 1946 Air Commodore E D H Davies (Temporary)
20 May 1946 Air Marshal Sir Alan Lees
1 October 1949 Air Marshal Sir Robert Foster 
RAF Home Command
1 August 1950 Air Marshal Sir Robert Foster 
31 Mar 1952 Air Marshal Sir Ronald Ivelaw-Chapman 
1 October 1952 Air Marshal Sir Harold Lydford       
March 1956 Air Marshal Sir Douglas Macfadyen

See also

 List of Royal Air Force commands

References

Maintenance Command